An orbital piercing is a combination of two ear piercings connected by one piece of jewelry. Usually located in the helix region of the ear, an Orbital Piercing can be done anywhere on the body including your earlobes.  The piercing uses a hoop, and is not to be confused with an industrial piercing, a conch piercing or double cartilage piercing.

Process
A professional piercer will have a sterilized hollowed gauge needle, a captive bead ring for jewelry, and a pair of pliers.

The piercer will take a marker and mark the placement of where you want your piercing. They will then take the hollow gauge needle and insert it through the marked position. With the needle still inserted in your ear the piercer will take the captive bead ring and slide in the hollow part of the needle, gently pulling the needle through the rest of your ear with the captive bead still in the needle. Once the jewelry is  placed correctly in your ear, the piercer will repeat the process again, except this time they will not insert a new captive ring. Using the second hole that was just made, the piercer will take the bead ring in the first hole and place it through the second hole. They then close the ring until there is very little space left for the bead to fit in the ring. Once the bead is placed and secured in the ring, the piercing is completed.

Types
There are two types of orbital piercings.

 Anti helix Piercing
 Helix Orbital Piercing

Aftercare
Wash your hands on a regular basis and use a cotton swab dipped in warm water and sea salt solution to remove any crust from the piercing and to keep clean from any infection. You will want to repeat these steps 3-5 times a day for the next 2–3 weeks. It is best if you sleep with a pillow that has a hole, such as a travel pillow, for greater comfort.

If your piercing is swollen for more than 2 weeks, starts seeping red, black or green colored fluid, bleeds continuously, or causes any problem with your hearing it is advised to call your piercer. In severe cases, see your doctor or go to a hospital.

References

External links
Body Piercing Fashion Jewelry
Why You Should Go For a Face Lift?

Ear piercing